See Me may refer to:

Arts, media, & entertainment 

 See Me (novel), a 2015 novel by Nicholas Sparks
 See Me (album), the 1979 studio album by Ronnie Lane
 See Me (song), the 2005 single by Melanie Blatt
 See Me (Kelly Rowland song), a 2019 song by Kelly Rowland
 See Me (Law & Order: Criminal Intent episode), an episode of Law & Order: Criminal Intent

Other uses 

 See.me, an American website for artists